Ghosi Assembly constituency is one of the 243 assembly constituencies of Bihar Legislative Assembly. 
It comes under Jahanabad (Lok Sabha constituency) for parliamentary elections.

Parts
This constituency includes nine panchayats of Kako block, Modanganj block, Ghosi block and Hulasganj block of Jehanabad district

Members of Legislative Assembly

Election Results

2020

References

External links
 

Assembly constituencies of Bihar